Innogen is a character in the Historia Regum Britanniae and subsequent medieval British pseudo-history. She was said to have been a Greek princess, the daughter of King Pandrasus, and to have become Britain's first Queen consort as the wife of Brutus of Troy, the purported first king of Britain who was said to have lived around the 12th century BC. Her sons Locrinus, Camber, and Albanactus went on to rule Loegria, Cambria, and Alba respectively.

Historia Regum Britanniae 

Innogen first appears in Geoffrey of Monmouth's Historia Regum Britanniae. She was the eldest daughter of the Greek king Pandrasus, and was given in marriage to Brutus of Troy after he united the enslaved Trojans in Greece and defeated Pandrasus to gain their freedom.

When Innogen left Greece with Brutus and the Trojans, she was inconsolable at leaving her parents and country. They travelled through the Mediterranean, around the coast of Iberia and Gaul, and arrived in Britain, where it was prophesied that Brutus would found an empire.

Innogen had three sons with Brutus, who divided his kingdom between them after his death: the eldest, Locrinus, inherited Loegria (England except for Cornwall, which belonged to Brutus' general Corineus); Camber inherited Cambria (Wales); and the youngest, Albanactus, inherited Alba (Scotland).

Her great-great grandson Ebraucus named one of his thirty daughters Ignogni, who was sent along with her sisters to Alba Silvius in Italy, where they were married to the Trojan nobility there.

Analysis 
Academic Fiona Tolhurst suggests that Innogen performs a pivotal function in the foundation of Brutus' Britain, by providing legitimacy to his rule through her bloodline, in the same way that Lavinia did for Aeneas.

Innogen or its equivalent appeared in early Celtic documentations of the legend of Brutus likely to identify her only as being the daughter of Pandrasus, rather than to indicate her proper name.

Name 
Innogen's name is spelled a number of different ways in the Historia Regum Britanniae, with the best readings being Innogen and Ignogen, but other spellings include Ignoge, Euogen, and Ygnogen.

However, Innogen could instead be derived from the Latin name , with a possible intermediate Celtic form of the name being Enogent. Some sources claim Innogen means  in Greek. The name Imogen is also attested from before the Historia Regum Britanniae.

Legacy 

Modern uses of the name Imogen probably derive from a misspelling of Innogen in the 1623 First Folio edition of William Shakespeare's Cymbeline. Shakespeare probably took the name from a retelling of the story of Innogen and Brutus in Holinshed's Chronicles (1577), and had used the name Innogen once before for a non-speaking 'ghost character' in Much Ado About Nothing (1600). An early description of Cymbeline by Simon Forman in 1611 consistently spells the name of the character as "Innogen", and the spelling of the character's name as "Imogen" in the First Folio appears to have been a result of "scribal or compositorial error".

Innogen was mentioned in the funeral orations of Anne of Brittany in 1514. In the oration, Guillaume Parvi traced Anne's ancestry back to Innogen, and recounted a story that explained the origin of her family's heraldic ermine coat of arms.

Edmund Spenser mentioned Innogen in book two, canto ten of The Faerie Queene (1590), as "fayre Inogene of Italy".

Innogen was a character in a lost play by Henry Chettle and John Day entitled The Conquest of Brute with the first finding of the Bath which was performed by the Lord Admiral's Men at the Rose in December 1598.

Notes

References

Legendary British people
British folklore